Emmanuel Hutteau (born 10 August 1968) is a French former professional footballer who played as a defender.

References

1968 births
Living people
Association football defenders
French footballers
INF Clairefontaine players
RC Strasbourg Alsace players
Bourges 18 players
RC Lens players
CS Sedan Ardennes players
AS Cannes players
Le Mans FC players
US Créteil-Lusitanos players
Angers SCO players
Red Star F.C. players
FC Rouen players
Ligue 1 players
Ligue 2 players
INF Vichy players
Sportspeople from Blois
Footballers from Centre-Val de Loire